The Niue national rugby league team represents Niue in rugby league football. The team played their first match in 1986, and their first Test match in 2013.

History

The team played their first match in at the 1986 Pacific Cup, losing 22–8 to the Cook Islands. Their first ever win was 14–0 against Fiji at the 1992 Pacific Cup. Niue currently participates in the annual Cabramatta International Nines tournament. They lost their first ever Test match 22–20 against Vanuatu on 12 October 2013.

Results

Pacific Cup

Current squad
Squad selected for the 2018 Emerging Nations World Championship;
Jake Samoa
Zebastian Luisi
Eddie Paea
Kurt Bernard
Temata Rangi
Mike Filimona
Tamati Ulukita
George Lolo
Sione Tovo
Tuki Jackson
Jamie Hunt
Jo Tamasi
Wes Lolo
Tristian Alvarado
Aziah Ikitule
Audrey Kaufusi
Huggard Tongatule
Latrell Schaumkel
Alex Seini
Alfred Smalley
Jordan Tongahai
Mike Williams
Cyruss Payne
Christian Ulukita

Test matches

All-time results record and ranking

Below is an updated list of Niue's national team record as of 23 December 2020.

Notable players of Niuean descent
 Dylan Brown
 Geoff Daniela
 Glen Fisiiahi
 Dene Halatau
Junior Langi
 Isaac Liu
 Heilum Luki
 Zebastian Luisi
 Makahesi Makatoa
Eddie Paea
 Joseph Paulo
 Junior Paulo
Toafofoa Sipley
Siosifa Talakai
Albert Talipeau
Motu Tony
Sione Tovo
Billy Weepu

Women's Test Team
The Niue women's rugby league team debuted on the international stage in the 2003 Women's Rugby League World Cup, in which they lost both of their matches. On 7 November 2020, they made their return to international rugby league, with a friendly match against the Tonga women's national rugby league team. The match, held at Mt Smart Stadium served as a lead up to the New Zealand Women vs Samoa Women.

See also
 Niue national rugby union team

References

External links